Nam Cheong Estate is a public housing estate in Sham Shui Po, Kowloon, Hong Kong near Nam Cheong Park, Tung Chau Street Park and MTR Nam Cheong station. It is named from nearby Nam Cheong Street, a main street in Sham Shui Po District. It consists of seven residential blocks completed in 1989. In 2005, the estate was sold to tenants through Tenants Purchase Scheme Phase 6B.

Houses

Demographics
According to the 2016 by-census, Nam Cheong Estate had a population of 4,847. The median age was 48.9 and the majority of residents (96.8 per cent) were of Chinese ethnicity. The average household size was 2.6 people. The median monthly household income of all households (i.e. including both economically active and inactive households) was HK$22,000.

Politics
Nam Cheong Estate is located in Nam Cheong West constituency of the Sham Shui Po District Council. It was formerly represented by Wai Woon-nam, who was elected in the 2019 elections until July 2021.

COVID-19 pandemic
Cheong Him House and Cheong Yat House at Nam Cheong Estate were placed under lockdown for mandatory covid test.

See also

Public housing estates in Sham Shui Po

References

Residential buildings completed in 1989
Public housing estates in Hong Kong
Tenants Purchase Scheme
Sham Shui Po
1989 establishments in Hong Kong